Eidos may refer to:

 Eidos (philosophy), a Greek term meaning "form" "essence", "type" or "species". See Plato's theory of forms and Aristotle's theory of universals
 Eidos Interactive, a video game publisher created by British software company Eidos plc, which was co-founded by Stephen B. Streater. Or its buyer, SCi Entertainment Group, which was briefly renamed Eidos.
 Eidos Hungary, a defunct Hungarian development studio formerly of Eidos Interactive
 Eidos-Montréal, a Canadian development studio of Embracer Group
 EidosMedia, an Italian software house
 Eidos, an Italian menswear brand owned by Isaia

See also 
 Eido (disambiguation)